Kang Baek-ho (born July 29, 1999) is a South Korean professional baseball left fielder for the KT Wiz of the KBO League.

Amateur career
Kang began playing baseball in elementary school but had to move between schools several times as a youth due to "a family issue" which he told Ilgan Sports was "hard to talk about."

Kang played high school baseball as a pitcher, catcher and designated hitter at Seoul High School where, as a freshman, he was the first player to hit a home run at Gocheok Sky Dome. In 2017, he led Seoul to a high school baseball championship and was named the most valuable player of the tournament. Kang's accomplishments as a high schooler brought him significant media attention. After high school, Kang decided to enter the KBO against the wishes of his father who wanted him to try for "a bigger stage."

Professional career
Kang was selected with the first overall pick in the 2017 KBO draft by the KT Wiz. He made his KBO debut at 18 years old and hit a home run against Héctor Noesí in the first plate appearance of his career. As a professional, he stopped pitching and catching and transitioned to the field. Kang set the rookie record with 29 home runs en route to winning the KBO League Rookie of the Year Award. Following the season, his salary was more than tripled to ₩120 million (equivalent to $ in 2019), setting a record for a sophomore player.

In June 2019, Kang underwent surgery on his hand after cutting it on a piece of metal while making a catch in foul territory at Busan Sajik Baseball Stadium. He sat out for the entire month of July due to the injury but was voted a starter on the all-star team nonetheless.

Kang missed three weeks of the 2020 season after hurting his wrist while sliding on defense. Fans voted Kang to the all-star team again in 2020 although the game did not take place due to the COVID-19 pandemic.

At the halfway point of the 2021 season, Kang had a batting average of .395 which led the league by 47 points. He reached base in eight consecutive plate appearances in Games 1 and 2 of the 2021 Korean Series, tying a Korean Series record.

International career
Kang represented South Korea at the 2017 U-18 Baseball World Cup where he pitched and played the field. He won a silver medal and was named to the All-World Team.

In 2019, he represented South Korea in the Premier12 and played well.

He was named to the South Korean roster for the 2020 Summer Olympics.

References

External links

1999 births
Living people
KBO League outfielders
South Korean baseball players
Baseball players from Seoul
KBO League Rookie of the Year Award winners
Seoul High School alumni
KT Wiz players
2019 WBSC Premier12 players
Baseball players at the 2020 Summer Olympics
Olympic baseball players of South Korea
2023 World Baseball Classic players